Abelmoschus angulosus is a plant species in the family Malvaceae, found in the Indian Subcontinent, Cambodia, Laos, Vietnam and Indonesia. It grows in temperate and wet regions between 750 and 2000 m, and is the only wild species of the genus Abelmoschus with a notable tolerance to low temperatures and light frost.

References

 Prodromus Florae Peninsulae Indiae Orientalis 53.  1834

angulosus
Flora of the Indian subcontinent
Flora of Indo-China
Flora of Java
Flora of Sumatra